C.G. Meaker Food Company Warehouse, in Syracuse, New York, was listed on the National Register of Historic Places on April 26, 2010.

The building was deemed significant as an "excellent local example of an early Modern poured-in-place concrete building."  It was planned during economic prosperity of the 1920s, but not completed until depression year 1930, in perhaps somewhat scaled-back form.  It is located on Erie Boulevard, which into the 1920s was the route of the Erie Canal, and later was route of railroads.

In May, 2016, a certified historic rehabilitation was completed.  The building is now home to 33 residential apartments and first-floor commercial space.

See also 
 National Register of Historic Places listings in Syracuse, New York

References

Commercial buildings on the National Register of Historic Places in New York (state)
Buildings and structures in Syracuse, New York
National Register of Historic Places in Syracuse, New York